Richard R. Boykin is a former member of the Cook County Board of Commissioners who represented the 1st district from December 2014 until December 2018.

Boykin was elected in 2014 to represent the 1st district on the Cook County Board of Commissioners. The 1st district covers both Chicago and its suburbs. It includes the Chicago neighborhoods of Garfield Park, and Humboldt Park, and the suburbs of Broadview, Maywood, Bellwood, Forest Park, Oak Park, and Elmwood Park.

On the Cook County Board of Commissioners, Boykin opposed the controversial "soda tax". Boykin came into conflict with the County Board President Toni Preckwinkle on this matter. Boykin took the lead against the tax, and succeeded in getting the Board to repeal it in 2017. On the infrequent votes by the Board that saw division by its members, Boykin was among the Board members who most frequently voted against the positions of County Board President Preckwinkle and her floor leader, Chuy García.

Per a 2018 analysis by the Chicago Sun-Times, Boykin had a high rate of attendance at board meetings, with the analysis finding him to have only missed 2% of meetings during a period from 2014 through 2017. The study found only John P. Daley to have a greater rate of attendance.

In 2018, Boykin narrowly lost reelection in the Democratic primary to Brandon Johnson, who had been endorsed against Boykin by Toni Preckwinkle.

In 2020, Boykin unsuccessfully ran for the Democratic nomination for Clerk of the Circuit Court of Cook County. Boykin unsuccessfully challenged President of the Cook County Board of Commissioners Toni Preckwinkle in that office's 2022 Democratic Party primary.

Electoral history

References

External links
 Official Richard R. Boykin website

Year of birth missing (living people)
Living people
African-American people in Illinois politics
Politicians from Chicago
University of Dayton alumni
Illinois Democrats
Members of the Cook County Board of Commissioners
21st-century African-American people